This is a list of current and former American television network morning programs.

Morning news programming begins at 4 a.m., 7 a.m., or later Eastern Time Zone/Pacific Time Zone. On cable television, news starts at 6 a.m., earlier, or later ET/PT.

Current 
All times Eastern Time Zone/Pacific Time Zone—see effects of time on North American broadcasting for explanation.

Former

Broadcast networks

CBS 

 CBS This Morning (November 30, 1987 – October 29, 1999 as the first incarnation and January 9, 2012 – September 6, 2021 as the second incarnation; replaced with CBS Mornings, CBS Saturday Morning, and CBS News Sunday Morning)
 The Early Show (November 1, 1999 – January 7, 2012)

Cable/satellite

BBC World News 

 GMT (February 1, 2010 – November 1, 2019)
 World News Today (July 03, 2006 – January, 31 2010)

CNN 

 American Morning (September 12, 2001 – December 30, 2011)
 New Day (June 17, 2013 – October 31, 2022; replaced with CNN This Morning)
 Starting Point (January 2, 2012 – March 29, 2013; cancelled due to poor ratings of the show and replaced with New Day)

HLN 

 Morning Express with Robin Meade (2005 – December 5, 2022; replaced with CNN This Morning simulcast)

Notes 

 d Times may vary by their stations.

References 

Lists of American television series
American television news shows